Hajjiabad-e Kark (also Romanized as Ḩājjīābād-e Kark; also known as Ḩājīābād, Haji Abad Olya, and Ḩājjīābād) is a village in Giyan Rural District, Giyan District, Nahavand County, Hamadan Province, Iran. At the 2006 census, its population was 231, in 57 families.

References 

Populated places in Nahavand County